Winter House may refer to:

in Canada
Winterhouse Brook in Woody Point, Newfoundland and Labrador 

in the United States
Amos G. Winter House, Kingfield, Maine, listed on the National Register of Historic Places (NRHP)
Plimpton-Winter House, Wrentham, Massachusetts, NRHP-listed
Winter House (Goodrich, North Dakota), NRHP-listed
William Winter Stone House, Mt. Olive, Ohio, NRHP-listed

See also
Winters House (disambiguation)